Leila Shahid (born in Beirut in 1949) is a Palestinian diplomat. She was the first woman ambassador of Palestine, serving the PLO in Ireland in 1989, in The Netherlands in 1990, then serving the PA in France where she had taken office in Paris in 1993. From 2006 to 2014, she was the General Delegate of Palestine to the EU, Belgium and Luxembourg.

She is the daughter of Munib Shahid and Serene Husseini Shahid and thus related to the Al-Husayni clan. Shahid's parents were from Acre and Jerusalem, but she grew up with her two sisters in exile in Lebanon. After studying anthropology and psychology at the American University of Beirut, Leila worked in the Palestinian refugee camps until 1974 when she began her doctorate in anthropology in Paris, where she met Jean Genet. In 1976 she was elected president of the Union of Palestinian students in France.

In September 1982, Shahid and Jean Genet went to Beirut. They arrived during the Sabra and Shatila massacres. Genet's account was published in "La revue d'études palestiniennes", in an article entitled Quatre heures à Chatila (Four Hours at Chatila) -- Catherine Biscovitch's film "Dancing Among the Dead" was based on this article by Genet.

In 2004, she was with Palestinian leader Yasser Arafat during his final days.

She was a longtime director of "La revue d'études palestiniennes" (The Review of Palestinian Studies), while serving as a board member right now.

The Russell Tribunal on Palestine was established in response to a call by Leila Shahid and Ken Coates (Chairperson of the Bertrand Russell Peace Foundation), Nurit Peled (Israeli, Sakharov Prize for Freedom of Speech 2001).

Though not a Baha'i, she is the great-great granddaughter of the Baha'i prophet Baha'u'llah through her father, who was a grandson of Abdu'l-Baha. Her father was excommunicated from the Baha'i Faith for opposition to Shoghi Effendi.

References

1949 births
Living people
Palestinian women in politics
Al-Husayni family
Palestine Liberation Organization members
Ambassadors of the State of Palestine to Denmark
Ambassadors of the State of Palestine to Ireland
Ambassadors of the State of Palestine to the Netherlands
Ambassadors of the State of Palestine to France
Palestinian women ambassadors